Tapan Assembly constituency is an assembly constituency in Dakshin Dinajpur district in the Indian state of West Bengal. It is reserved for scheduled tribes.

Overview
As per orders of the Delimitation Commission, No. 40 Tapan Assembly constituency (ST) covers Dwipkhanda, Gophanagar, Harsura, Malancha and Tapan Chandipur gram panchayats of Tapan community development block, and Boaldar, Chak Vrigu, Jalghar, Bolla, Danga, Gopalbati, Najirpur and Patiram gram panchayats of Balurghat community development block,

Tapan Assembly constituency (ST) is part of No. 6 Balurghat (Lok Sabha constituency).

Members of Legislative Assembly

Election results

2021 Election
In the 2021 West Bengal Legislative Assembly election, Budhrai Tudu of BJP defeated his nearest rival, Kalpana Kisku of TMC.

2016 Election
In the 2016 West Bengal Legislative Assembly election, Bachchu Hansda of TMC defeated his nearest rival Raghu Urow of RSP.

2011
In the 2011 election, Bachchu Hansda of Trinamool Congress defeated his nearest rival Khara Soren of RSP.

.# Trinamool Congress did not contest the seat in 2006.

1977–2006
Khara Soren of RSP won the Tapan (ST) assembly  seat six times in a row, defeating his nearest rivals Columbus Tirkey of BJP in 2006, Anony Uraw of Trinamool Congress in 2001, Lakshmi Ram Hembram of Congress in 1996 and 1991, Japan Bhonajala of Congress in 1987, and Japan Hasda of Congress in 1982. Contests in most years were multi cornered but only winners and runners are being mentioned. Natheniel Murmu of RSP defeated Sebastian Tudu of Congress in 1977.

1962–1972
Patrash Hembram of Congress won in 1972 and 1971. Nathaniel Murmu of RSP/ Independent, won in 1969, 1967 and 1962. Prior to the Tapan seat was not there.

References

Assembly constituencies of West Bengal
Politics of Dakshin Dinajpur district